Anna Cymmerman is a Polish operatic soprano. She studied at the Academy of Music in Łódź where she majored in Vocal Acting and Performance and graduated with honors in June, 2000. While a student, she debuted as a soloist in the Grand Theatre, Łódź. There, she performed in Polish as Blanche in Poulenc's Dialogues of the Carmelites directed by Christopher Kelm. Her performance was appreciated both by critics and viewers.  She won a competition whose judges included Ewa Podleś and Andrzej Drabowicz. She has since performed in opera productions in Austria, Denmark, Holland, and Germany. Her performance in Karol Szymanowski's Stabat Mater at Chicago's International Music Theater was considered a great success.

Cymmerman's repertoire of leading roles includes Elvira in Verdi's Ernani; the Second Lady in Mozart's The Magic Flute (touring to Germany, Denmark, Netherlands, Belgium); Corinna in Rossini's Il viaggio a Reims for the Polish National Opera, the Grand Theatre, Warsaw; Neddy in Leoncavallo's Pagliacci (Grand Theatre); Margaret in Gounod's Faust for the Baltic State Opera in Gdańsk, the title role in the Polish premiere of Cilea's Adriana Lecouvreur (Grand Theatre), the Countess in Mozart's The Marriage of Figaro and the title role in Stanisław Moniuszko's The Countess. In the lighter repertoire, her roles include Sylva in Kálmán's Die Csárdásfürstin, Hanna Glawari in Lehár's The Merry Widow, Rosalinde in Strauss' Die Fledermaus, the Widow in Kander's Zorba, and Clara in Gershwin's Porgy and Bess.

Sources
Grand Theatre, Łódź, Biography: Anna Cymmerman (sopran) (in Polish)

External links
Official web site with scanned publications about her 

Living people
Year of birth missing (living people)
Place of birth missing (living people)
21st-century Polish women opera singers
Polish operatic sopranos